Orphan Stone can refer to:
 Al-Yatīma, a pearl associated with the crown jewels of the Abbasids
 Der Weise, a precious stone associated with the crown jewels of the medieval Holy Roman Emperors